War to End All Wars is the thirteenth studio album by guitarist Yngwie Malmsteen, released on 7 November 2000 through Pony Canyon (Japan), Spitfire Records (United States) and DreamCatcher Records (Europe). While on tour for this album, singer Mark Boals left the band and was replaced for a brief period by Jørn Lande; however, Boals returned to finish the tour. The instrumental song "Molto Arpeggiosa" is often mislabelled as "Arpeggios from Hell". The phrase "the war to end all wars" was historically used as a description of World War I, especially in the period from 1918 to 1939.

Track listing

Bonus tracks (Japan)

Bonus track (USA and Europe)

Personnel
Yngwie J. Malmsteen	 - 	Guitar, Bass, Sitar, Vocals, Producer, Mixing
Mats Olausson	 - 	Keyboards
Mark Boals	 - 	Vocals
John Macaluso	 - 	Drums
Brian Fitzpatrick	 - 	Engineer, Mixing
Michael Fuller	 - 	Mastering
Michael Johansson	 - 	Photography
Rich DiSilvio	 - 	Artwork
Frank Frazetta	 - 	Cover Art

References

2000 albums
Yngwie Malmsteen albums
Albums with cover art by Frank Frazetta